Quebrachitol is a naturally occurring optically active cyclitol, a cyclic polyol. It can be found in Allophylus edulis and in the serum left after the coagulation of the Hevea brasiliensis latex in the operation of rubber tapping. It is also found in Cannabis sativa, in Paullinia pinnata and in seabuckthorn.

It was first isolated by Tanret in 1887 from the bark of Aspidosperma quebracho. The substance was tested as a sweetening agent for diabetics in 1933. It shows a sweetening property half of that of sucrose but induces colic or diarrhoea at concentration used to render the food palatable. 

Quebrachitol is a versatile building block in the construction of naturally occurring bioactive materials. For example, its conversion into antifungal (E)-β-methoxyacrylate, oudemansin X has been made.

References

External links 

Cyclitols